Ubben is a surname. Notable people with the surname include:

 Jeffrey W. Ubben (born 1961/1962), American businessman
 Kerstin Ubben (born 1968), German badminton player
 Kurt Ubben (1911–1944), German fighter ace during World War II

See also